The 1984 Irish Masters was the tenth edition of the professional invitational snooker tournament, which took place from 27 March to 1 April 1984. The tournament was played at Goffs in Kill, County Kildare, and featured twelve professional players.

Steve Davis won the title for the second time, beating Terry Griffiths 9–1 in the final.

Main draw

References

Irish Masters
Irish Masters
Irish Masters
Irish Masters